Grindall may refer to:

Richard Grindall (1750–1820), British admiral
Grindall Island, an island in Alaska in the United States
, a British frigate in commission in the Royal Navy from 1943 to 1945
USS Grindall (DE-273), a United States Navy destroyer escort in commission from August to October 1945 which previously had served in the Royal Navy as 

See also
William Grindal ( ? - 1548), English scholar